Igor Korobchinski (Ihor Korobchynskyi; born 16 August 1969) is a former gymnast that represented the Soviet Union, the Commonwealth of Independent States and Ukraine. In 2016, he was inducted in the International Gymnastics Hall of Fame.

External links
 
 
 

1969 births
Living people
People from Antratsyt
Ukrainian male artistic gymnasts
Soviet male artistic gymnasts
World champion gymnasts
Medalists at the World Artistic Gymnastics Championships
Olympic gold medalists for the Unified Team
Olympic bronze medalists for the Unified Team
Olympic gymnasts of the Unified Team
Gymnasts at the 1992 Summer Olympics
Olympic gymnasts of Ukraine
Gymnasts at the 1996 Summer Olympics
Olympic medalists in gymnastics
Medalists at the 1996 Summer Olympics
Medalists at the 1992 Summer Olympics
European champions in gymnastics
Sportspeople from Luhansk Oblast